The Mekong leaf-toed gecko (Dixonius mekongensis) is a species of lizard in the family Gekkonidae. It is endemic to Thailand.

References

Dixonius
Reptiles of Thailand
Endemic fauna of Thailand
Reptiles described in 2021
Taxa named by Olivier Sylvain Gérard Pauwels
Taxa named by Kirati Kunya
Taxa named by Montri Sumontha